Ouinderden  is a rural commune of the Cercle of Gourma-Rharous in the Tombouctou Region of Mali. The seat lies at Adiora. The commune contains 28 small villages and in the 2009 census had a population of 6,105, nearly all of whom are nomadic pastoralists.

References

External links
.
.

Communes of Tombouctou Region